Trail Side is an unincorporated community and a census-designated place (CDP) located in and governed by Morgan County, Colorado, United States. The CDP is a part of the Fort Morgan, CO Micropolitan Statistical Area. The population of the Trail Side CDP was 157 at the United States Census 2020. The  post office  serves the area.

Geography

Demographics

See also

Outline of Colorado
Index of Colorado-related articles
State of Colorado
Colorado cities and towns
Colorado census designated places
Colorado counties
Morgan County, Colorado
Colorado metropolitan areas
Fort Morgan Micropolitan Statistical Area

References

External links

Morgan County website

Census-designated places in Morgan County, Colorado
Census-designated places in Colorado